William Mosses (1858 – 17 May 1943) was a British trade unionist.

Mosses was elected as general secretary of the United Patternmakers Association in 1884, and served in the post for 33 years.  He supported Robert Knight's initiative to found the Federation of Engineering and Shipbuilding Trades, a loose body bringing together a variety of craft unions, and he served as its first general secretary, from 1890.

Mosses was also active in the Trades Union Congress (TUC); he served on its Parliamentary Committee from 1907 to 1911, and again from 1913 until 1917.  In 1905, he was the TUC delegate to the American Federation of Labour.

Mosses resigned all his trade union positions in 1917 to take up a government post.

References

1858 births
1943 deaths
General Secretaries of the United Patternmakers' Association
Members of the Parliamentary Committee of the Trades Union Congress